Women's 50 metre rifle three positions (then known as standard rifle) was one of the thirteen shooting events at the 1988 Summer Olympics.

Qualification round

OR Olympic record – Q Qualified for final

Final

OR Olympic record

References

Sources

Shooting at the 1988 Summer Olympics
Olymp
Shoo
Women's 050m 3 positions 1988